Compsoctena is a genus of moths in the family Eriocottidae. It was erected by Philipp Christoph Zeller in 1852.

Species
 Compsoctena aedifica Meyrick, 1908
 Compsoctena aethalea Meyrick, 1907
 Compsoctena africanella Strand, 1909
 Compsoctena agria Meyrick, 1909
 Compsoctena araeopis Meyrick, 1926
 Compsoctena autoderma Meyrick, 1914
 Compsoctena barbarella Walker, 1856
 Compsoctena brachyctenis Meyrick, 1909
 Compsoctena brandbergensis Mey, 2007
 Compsoctena byrseis (Meyrick, 1934)
 Compsoctena connexalis Walker, 1863
 Compsoctena cossinella Walker, 1866
 Compsoctena cossusella Walker, 1856
 Compsoctena cyclatma Meyrick, 1908
 Compsoctena dehradunensis Pathania & Rose, 2004
 Compsoctena delocrossa Meyrick, 1921
 Compsoctena dermatodes Meyrick, 1914
 Compsoctena expers Meyrick, 1911
 Compsoctena fossoria Meyrick, 1920
 Compsoctena furciformis Meyrick, 1921
 Compsoctena himachalensis Pathania & Rose, 2004
 Compsoctena indecorella Walker, 1856
 Compsoctena intermediella Walker, 1866
 Compsoctena invariella Walker, 1863
 Compsoctena isopetra Meyrick, 1921
 Compsoctena kaokoveldi Mey, 2011
 Compsoctena leucoconis Meyrick, 1926
 Compsoctena lycophanes Meyrick, 1924
 Compsoctena media Walsingham, 1897
 Compsoctena melitoplaca Meyrick, 1927
 Compsoctena microctenis Meyrick, 1914
 Compsoctena minor Walsingham, 1866
 Compsoctena montana Dierl, 1970
 Compsoctena niphocosma (Meyrick, 1934)
 Compsoctena numeraria Meyrick, 1914
 Compsoctena ochrastis Meyrick, 1937
 Compsoctena ostracitis Meyrick, 1913
 Compsoctena pantherina Sobczyk, 2012
 Compsoctena pinguis Meyrick, 1914
 Compsoctena primella Zeller, 1852
 Compsoctena psammosticha Meyrick, 1921
 Compsoctena quassa Meyrick, 1921
 Compsoctena reductella Walker, 1863
 Compsoctena robinsoni Pathania & Rose, 2004
 Compsoctena rudis Meyrick, 1921
 Compsoctena rustica Strand, 1914
 Compsoctena scriba Meyrick, 1921
 Compsoctena secundella Walsingham, 1897
 Compsoctena similis Dierl, 1970
 Compsoctena spilophanes Meyrick, 1921
 Compsoctena susurrans (Meyrick, 1911)
 Compsoctena talarodes Meyrick, 1927
 Compsoctena taprobana Walsingham, 1887
 Compsoctena terrestris Meyrick, 1914
 Compsoctena thwaitesii Walsingham, 1887
 Compsoctena ursulella Walker, 1863
 Compsoctena vilis Walker, 1865

References

 , 1970: Compsoctenidae: Ein neues Taxon von Familienstatus (Lepitoptera). Veröffentlichungen der Zoologischen Staatssammlung München, 014: 1- 41. Full article: .
 , 2011: New and little known species of Lepidoptera of southwestern Africa. Esperiana Buchreihe zur Entomologie Memoir 6: 146-261.
 , 2012: Compsoctena pantherina sp. n. - eine neue Art der Eriocottidae aus Südostasien (Lepidoptera). Entomofauna 33 (1): 173-180.

 
Eriocottidae